Molise is a region of Southern Italy. Until 1963, it formed part of the region of Abruzzi e Molise together with Abruzzo. The split, which did not become effective until 1970, makes Molise the newest region in Italy. Covering , it is the second smallest region in the country, after the Aosta Valley, and has a population of 313,348 (as of 1 January 2015).

The region is split into two provinces, named after their respective capitals: Campobasso and Isernia. Campobasso also serves as the regional capital.

Geography 

Molise is bordered by Abruzzo to the north, Apulia to the east, Lazio to the west, and Campania to the south. It has  of sandy coastline to the northeast, lying on the Adriatic Sea looking out towards the Tremiti islands.
The countryside of Molise is mostly mountainous, with 55% covered by mountains and most of the rest by hills that go down to the sea.

Main sights and monuments

Campobasso 

Castello Monforte
Terzano Tower
Campobasso Cathedral (Santissima Trinità)
Church of Sant'Antonio
Church of San Bartolomeo
Church of San Giorgio
Savoia Theater
San Giorgio Palace (Head of municipality)
Provincial Museum of "Sanniti"

Isernia 

Isernia Cathedral (San Pietro)
Fountain Fraterna
Monumental complex and museum of Santa Maria delle Monache Abbey
Sanctuary of Santi Cosma e Damiano
Archeological site Isernia La Pineta
Museum of Paleolithic in the site of La Pineta

Termoli 
Cathedral of San Basso from Lucera
Medieval castle of Frederick II
Sinarca Tower
Rinascimental Gallery Museum

Venafro 
Castle Pandone
Venafro Cathedral
Archeogical Museum of Venafro
War Museum Winterline Venafro

Province of Campobasso 

Trivento Cathedral
Church of Santa Maria Maggiore (Guglionesi)
Santuario di Santa Maria del Canneto (Roccavivara)
Caldora Castle (Carpinone)
Castle Anjou (Civitacampomarano)
Longobard Castle (Tufara)
Bojano Cathedral (San Bartolomeo)
Medieval fortress Civita Superiore (Bojano)
Angioina Tower (Colletorto)
Larino Cathedral
Archeological site and Roman theater of Larinum (Larino)
Archeological site and museum of Altilia (Sepino)
Italic sanctuary of San Pietro dei Cantoni (Sepino)
Megalithic wall of Saipins (Terravecchia zone – Sepino) 
Church of Santa Maria della Strada (Matrice)
Guardialfiera old town
Capua castle (Gambatesa)

Province of Isernia 
Abbey of San Vincenzo al Volturno (Castel San Vincenzo)
Marinelli Bells Factory and Museum (Agnone)
Theatre and Italic temple in the archeological site of Pietrabbondante
Parish church and belfry of Saint Silvestro (Bagnoli del Trigno)
Bagnoli del Trigno (The pearl of Molise)
Rupestrian church of Pietracupa
Church of Sant'Antonio Abate (Pietracupa)
Capracotta
Neogothic basilica of Santa Maria Addolorata (Castelpetroso)
Venafro Cathedral
Castle Pandone (Venafro)
Castle Pandone (Cerro al Volturno)
Abbey of Santa Maria del Carmelo (Roccavivara)
Castle D'Alessandro (Pescolanciano)
Colli a Volturno
Fornelli

Economy 

Agriculture, involving small and micro holdings, is currently offering high-quality products. The agricultural holdings produce wine, cereals, olive oil, vegetables, fruits and dairy products. Traditional products are Grass Pea (cicerchia) and Farro. Molise's autochthonous grape is Tintilia which has been rediscovered during the last ten years, and many other PDO (DOP) wines, both red and white.

Though there is a large Fiat plant (Termoli), the industrial sector is dominated by the farming industry with small and medium-sized farms spread widely throughout the region. Another important industry is food processing: pasta, meat, milk products, oil and wine are the traditional products of the region. In the services sector the most important industries are distribution, hotels and catering, followed by transport and communications, banking and insurance. With few exceptions, in all sectors firms are small, and this explains the difficulties encountered when marketing products on a national scale.

International tourism is growing largely as a result of the recent opening of international flights from other European countries to Pescara Airport, which is not far to the north in Abruzzo and connected to Molise by the A14 highway (the only highway passing through Molise, by Termoli).

The unemployment rate stood at 9.5% in 2020.

Demographics 

The density of the population in Molise is well below the national average. In 2008, Molise registered 72.3 inhabitants per km2, compared to a national figure of 198.8. The region is subdivided into two provinces: Campobasso and Isernia, which together cover 1.5% of Italy's territory and less than 1% of its population. The larger province in terms of area is Campobasso at 2,909 km2, while the smaller is Isernia at 1,529 km2. The province of Campobasso is the more densely populated of the two provinces, with 79.4 inhabitants per km2, whereas Isernia registers 58.9 inhabitants per km2. At the end of 2008 the most populous towns were Campobasso (51,247 inhabitants), Termoli (32,420) and Isernia (21,811).

In the period 1951–71, large-scale emigration to other countries of the European Union, to other parts of Italy and overseas led to a significant decline in the population of Molise. Negative net migration persisted until 1981. Large-scale emigration has caused many of the smaller towns and villages to lose over 60% of their population, while only a small number of larger towns have recorded significant gains. From 1982 to 1994, net migration has been positive, then followed by a negative trend until 2001. Between 1991 (330,900 inhabitants) and 2001 (320,601 inhabitants), the population of the region decreased by 3.1%; since 2001 the population remained stable.

The region is home to two main ethnic minorities: the Molisan Croats (20,000 people who speak an old Dalmatian dialect of Croatian alongside Italian), and those who speak the "arbereshe" dialect of Albanian in five towns of "basso Molise" in the province of Campobasso.

Government and politics

Administrative divisions
Molise comprises two provinces:

Culture

Molise has much tradition from the religious to the pagans, many museum, archeological sites, musical and food events.

Tradition
 The Festival dei Misteri in Campobasso (Corpus Domini)
 Feast of Saint Pardo with ox chariot (cart) in Larino (25-26-27/May)
 Ox chariots (La Carrese) and feast of Saint Leo in San Martino in Pensilis (30 April and 2 May)
 The Ndocciata of Agnone (8-24/December)
 The Saint Basso feast in Termoli with procession of boats on the sea (4 August)
 "U lut'm sab't d'April" of Santa Croce di Magliano with benediction of animals (Last Saturday of April)
 Procession of Good Friday in Campobasso
 The procession of hooded on the Good Friday at Isernia
 The fire of Saint Anthony the Abbot in Colletorto (17 January)
 The feast of Saint Nicandro in Venafro (17 June)
 The ox chariots and feast in the village of Ururi and Portocannone
 The feast of San Biagio in San Biase (3 February), with the traditional game of the Morra and the distribution of Bread to all the inhabitants

Arts, musical and food festivals
 The international bagpipe festival of Scapoli in July
 The "Pezzata" of Capracotta the first Sunday of August
 The fish festival of Termoli in August
 The Staffoli Horses in August close Agnone
 The grape feast of Riccia in September
 The grain feast of Jelsi on 26 July
 The international festival of folk in the Matese in San Massimo
 The exhibition of black truffle in San Pietro Avellana
 The carnival of Larino in February
 "Gl' Cierv" in the carnival of Castelnuovo del Volturno the last Sunday of February

Museums
 National museum of paleolithic in Isernia
 Monumental complex and museum of Santa Maria delle Monache in Isernia
 Museum of "Tombolo" in Isernia
 Provincial museum of Samnium in Campobasso
 Museum of Zampogna (Bagpipe) in Scapoli
 Antiquarium of Saepinum-Altilia in Sepino
 Photographic museum "Tony Vaccaro" in Bonefro
Archeological museum of Venafro
War Museum Winterline Venafro
Santa Chiara Museum Venafro

Cuisine
The cuisine of Molise is similar to the cuisine of Abruzzo, though there are some differences in the dishes and ingredients.  The flavors of Molise are dominated by the many aromatic herbs that grow there. Some of the characteristic foods include spicy salami, a variety of locally produced cheeses, dishes using lamb or goat, pasta dishes with hearty sauces, and vegetables that grow in the region.

In addition to bruschetta, a typical antipasto  will consist of any of several meat dishes, such as the sausages capocollo, the fennel-seasoned salsiccie al finocchio, soppressata, ventricina, frascateglie or sanguinaccio. In addition to these sausages, a variety of ham is available, such as smoked prosciutto.  Frequently, the sausages are enjoyed with polenta.

Main dishes of the region include:
 Brodosini made of tagliatelle in broth with pork cheek and fat
 Calcioni di ricotta, a specialty of Campobasso, made of fried pasta stuffed with ricotta, provolone, prosciutto, and parsley, and usually served with fried artichokes, cauliflower, brains, sweetbread, potato croquette, and scamorza cheese
 Cavatiegl e Patane, or gnocchi served in a meat sauce of rabbit and pork
 A variety of pasta such as cavatelli, lasagna, or maccheroni served with a ragù of lamb or goat
 Pasta e fagioli, pasta-and-white-bean soup cooked with pig's feet and pork rinds
 Polenta d'iragn, a polenta-like dish actually made of wheat and potatoes, sauced with raw tomatoes and pecorino
 Risotto alla marinara, a risotto with seafood
 Spaghetti with diavolillo, a strong chili pepper sauce
 Zuppa di cardi, a soup of cardoons, tomatoes, onions, pancetta, olive oil
 Zuppa di ortiche, a soup of nettle stems, tomatoes, onions, pancetta, olive oil

Common second dishes (often meat and vegetable dishes) are:
 Lamb, the most popular meat, served grilled, roasted, or stewed
 Many organ meats of lamb, especially tripe, are popular
 Coniglio alla molisana, grilled rabbit pieces skewered with sausage and herbs
 Mazzarelle, tightly wrapped rolls made with lung and tripe of lamb
 Ragù d' agnello, braised lamb with sweet peppers, a specialty of Isernia
 Torcinelli, rolled strips of lamb tripe, sweetbreads, and liver
 Pamparella or pork pancetta dried with peperoncino, soaked in wine and cut into small pieces. Pamparella is used to flavor sauces, in particular the sauce for dressing the tacconi, a rustic pasta made with flour and water.
 Saucicc', Paparuol' e Ova Fritte, sausage with sweet pepper and fried eggs

Typical vegetable dishes may include:
 Carciofi ripieni, artichokes stuffed with anchovies and capers
 Peeled sweet peppers stuffed with breadcrumbs, anchovies, parsley, basil and peperoncino, sautéed in a frying pan and cooked with chopped tomatoes
 Cipollacci con pecorino, fried strong onions and pecorino cheese
 Frittata con basilico e cipolle, omelette with basil and onions

Fish dishes include red mullet soup, and spaghetti with cuttlefish. Trout from the Biferno river is notable for its flavor, and is cooked with a simple but tasty sauce of aromatic herbs. Zuppa di pesce, a fish stew, is a specialty of Termoli.

The cheeses produced in Molise are not very different from those produced in Abruzzo. The more common ones are Burrino and Manteca, soft, buttery cow's-milk cheeses; Pecorino, sheep's-milk cheese, served young and soft or aged and hard, called also "Maciuocco" in Molise; Scamorza, bland cow's-milk cheese, often served grilled; and Caciocavallo, sheep's-milk cheese.

Sweets and desserts have an ancient tradition here and are linked to the history of the territory and to religious and family festivities. Most common are:
 Calciumi (also called caucioni or cauciuni), sweet ravioli filled with chestnuts, almonds, chocolate, vanilla, cooked wine musts, and cinnamon and then fried
 Ciambelline, ring-shaped cakes made in the countryside. They may be all'olio (with olive oil) or al vino rosso (with red wine).
 Ferratelle all'anice, anise cakes made in metal molds and stamped with special patterns
 Ricotta pizza, a cake pan filled with a blend of ricotta cheese, sugar, flour, butter, maraschino liqueur, and chocolate chips

International relations

Twin towns — sister cities 
Molise is twinned with:

 Nowy Sącz, Poland

See also 
 2002 Molise earthquakes
 Ndocciata, a torchlit parade traditionally held in Molise on Christmas Eve
 Molise Croats

References

External links 

 Official Site of the Regione Molise 
 Molise Region information site 
 Images of Molise
 Molisediscovery
 MoliseLab

 
Regions of Italy
States and territories established in 1963